Tall Dwarfs are a New Zealand rock band formed in 1981 by Chris Knox and Alec Bathgate, who helped pioneer the lo-fi style of rock music. The duo were former members of Toy Love.

The band lacked a drummer, but would use household objects and hand claps to act as percussion. Both members can play guitar, with 12 strings and bass guitar often heard on their records. Both can play organ as well, which has been utilised on some of their songs. The Casiotone is frequently used too, especially on live concerts.

Their debut was the EP Three Songs (1981), and for many years they released EPs only. The album Weeville (1990) was their first full-length album. They did, however, release a number of full-length compilations of their EPs, like Hello Cruel World and The Short and Sick of It.

In the liner notes to their album 3 EPs (1994) (released as a single CD, or as three vinyl EPs collected in one box), they asked for listeners' rhythm tracks: "Send us your idea of a great T.D. throb." The responses came from many different countries and were used for the next album, Stumpy (1997). This album was therefore officially credited to "International Tall Dwarfs."

Bands who have claimed to be influenced by the Tall Dwarfs include Elf Power, Neutral Milk Hotel and Olivia Tremor Control. In 2005, they did a small number of concerts in the US, playing with the Olivia Tremor Control.

Discography

References

External links
 Audioculture profile
 Flying Nun – Flying Nun Records official website

New Zealand indie rock groups
Flying Nun Records artists
Dunedin Sound musical groups